The Gen. William Floyd House is a historic house on Main Street at Gifford Hill Road in Westernville, New York.  Built in 1803, it was the last home of Founding Father William Floyd (1734–1821), a signer of the Declaration of Independence, and a driving force in the settlement of the area.  It was declared a National Historic Landmark in 1971.  The house is a private residence, and is not normally open to the public.

Description and history
The Gen. William Floyd House is located in the village center of Westernville, on the west side of Main Street at its junction with Gifford Hill Road.  The house's main block is a -story wood-frame structure, with a gabled roof, two interior chimneys and clapboarded exterior.  It is oriented facing roughly southwest, with a two-story ell extending to the west.  The main facade is five bays wide, with a center entrance.  The interior follows a center hall plan, with the main staircase on the left side of the central, a pair of parlors to the right, and the dining room and study to the left.  Preserved period elements include wide floor boards and paneled fireplace walls.

The house was built in 1803 by William Floyd, a signer of the United States Declaration of Independence. Floyd, a native of Mastic, New York, served in the New York militia during the American Revolutionary War, rising to the rank of major general. He began developing the grant soon afterward, and moved to what is now Westernville in 1803, when this house was finished. The house remained in the hands of his descendants until 1956.

Floyd's home in Mastic, New York, still stands, and is also listed on the National Register of Historic Places.  The two William Floyd houses are believed to be the only surviving homes in New York of signers of the Declaration of Independence.

References

External links

General William Floyd House - web site by current owners
General William Floyd House Auction June 19&20, 2010

Houses on the National Register of Historic Places in New York (state)
National Historic Landmarks in New York (state)
Houses completed in 1803
Houses in Oneida County, New York
Historic American Buildings Survey in New York (state)
National Register of Historic Places in Oneida County, New York
Homes of United States Founding Fathers